The 1972 Limerick Senior Hurling Championship was the 78th staging of the Limerick Senior Hurling Championship since its establishment by the Limerick County Board in 1887.

Claughaun were the defending champions.

On 10 December 1972, South Liberties won the championship after a 4-08 to 1-05 defeat of Patrickswell in the final. It was their fourth championship title overall and their first championship title since 1890.

Results

Final

Championship statistics

Miscellaneous

 South Liberties end an 82 year gap to win the first time since 1890.

References

Limerick Senior Hurling Championship
Limerick Senior Hurling Championship